The 12101/12102 Jnaneswari Super Deluxe Express, also spelled Dnyaneswari (in Marathi) and Gyaneshwari (in Hindi), is a Superfast class train of Indian Railways connecting two metropolitan cities of India, Kolkata and Mumbai.

Traction 
It is hauled by a Santragachi based WAP-7 Locomotive (End to End). Top speed permissible is 130km/h.

Coach Composition

Train schedule
From Lokmanya Tilak Terminus to Shalimar - 12101. The train starts from Lokmanya Tilak Terminus every Monday, Tuesday, Friday & Saturday.

Note : Train stops at Kasara & Igatpuri Railway Station only for Bankers Loco attachment & removal at the back of the Train. There is no Commercial halt at these Stations.

Accident

On 28 May 2010 Mumbai-bound Jnaneswari Super Deluxe Express derailed between Sardiha and Khemasuli stations of West Midnapore claiming 150 lives and 46 injured.

References

External links
https://web.archive.org/web/20131125225205/http://www.indianrail.gov.in/

Transport in Mumbai
Rail transport in Howrah
Express trains in India
Rail transport in Maharashtra
Rail transport in Chhattisgarh
Rail transport in Odisha
Rail transport in Jharkhand
Rail transport in West Bengal
Railway services introduced in 1999
Named passenger trains of India